Charles Arthur Stuart (May 26, 1893 – October 17, 1962) was an American physician and professor of bacteriology. He was the president of the American Society for Microbiology (ASM) in 1956.

Biography
After education in public schools at Plattsburgh, New York, Stuart matriculated in 1914 at Brown University. There he graduated with a bachelor's degree in 1919, an M.S. in 1921, and a Ph.D. in 1923. His Ph.D. thesis is entitled The Effect of Environmental Changes on the Growth, Morphology, Physiology and Immunological Characteristics of Bacterium typhosum. From 1917 to 1918 he served in the Brown Ambulance Unit of the American Volunteer Motor Ambulance Corps. In the bacteriology department of Brown University, he was an instructor from 1923–1925, an assistant professor from 1925–1931, an associate professor from 1931 to 1944, and a full professor from 1944 until his retirement in 1960 as professor emeritus. For 35 years, he was a part-time teacher of student nurses at Rhode Island Hospital. He served as a consultant in bacteriology for several Rhode Island hospitals as a member of the Milk Commission of the Providence Medical Association.

Stuart was the author or coauthor of more than 100 scientific papers. In the early part of his career, he worked with Frederic Poole Gorham and Charles V. Chapin on laboratory aspects of public health in Providence, Rhode Island. In the late 1920s he became interested in the findings of Arthur M. Banta concerning sex-determining factors in the water flea Moina macrocopa. Stuart collaborated on a number of scientific papers concerning such factors, especially the availability of bacteria as a food source for the water fleas. In the mid-1930s he did research on Forssman antigens in mononucleosis. He did important research on the taxonomy of the family Enterobacteriaceae.

Stuart was elected in 1933 a fellow of the American Association for the Advancement of Science.

He married in 1924 and his wife often helped him with laboratory work. He is buried in Swan Point Cemetery.

Selected publications
 
 
 
 
 
 
 
 
 
 
 
 
 
 
  1955

References

1893 births
1962 deaths
20th-century American physicians
American bacteriologists
Brown University alumni
Brown University faculty
Fellows of the American Association for the Advancement of Science
Burials at Swan Point Cemetery